Bagh-e Gol (also Romanized as Bāgh-e Gol) is a village in Howmeh Rural District, in the Central District of Bam County, Kerman Province, Iran. At the 2006 census, its population was 69, in 23 families.

References 

Populated places in Bam County